Reamonn is the fifth studio album by the German band Reamonn. In Germany, it was released on 7 November 2008 by Universal Music. In the UK, it was released on 28 September 2009.

The album is a comeback album for the group, because the members of Reamonn had wanted to separate, but reconciled their differences and returned to the studio. It became, eventually, Reamonn's final studio album, as the band entered a hiatus in 2012.

Singles
"Open Skies" was the first single from the album. It was the theme song for the German film The Red Baron. The song was only released as a digital download.

"Through the Eyes of a Child" was released as the second single from the album. Lyrics include: "Why did we make it so hard? / This life is so complicated / until we see it through the eyes of a child."

"Million Miles" was the third single from the album. Fans could vote for the album's best song on Reamonn's official website, and "Million Miles" received most votes and was therefore released as the next single. On the cover is the following text: "Home is where there's no mistaking / All this space between us / Isn't going anywhere / But it's ok to be us." The song was co-written by Kara DioGuardi.

"Moments Like This" was the fourth single from the album. It is a very fast rock song. Lyrics include: "And moments like this will bring you down / And moments like this will bring you round / And moments like this will make you strong".

"Aeroplane" was the fifth single from the album. It is a rock song. Lyrics include: "I love you like an aeroplane / which is bringing me home again."

"Set of Keys" was released digitally as their first UK single on 11 May 2009.

Track listing

Personnel
Rea Garvey - vocals, guitar
Uwe Bossert - guitar
Sebastian Padotzke - keyboards
Philipp Rauenbusch - bass guitar
Gomezz - beats

Charts

Weekly charts

Year-end charts

Certifications
Gold and Platinum in Germany
Gold in Switzerland

Release history

References
All information without a note is from the booklet.

External links
 Reamonn's website
 Reamonn: Reamonn at Last.fm

2008 albums
Reamonn albums